Pima Bajo may refer to:
 Pima Bajo people, an ethnic group of Mexico
 Pima Bajo language, their language